The 1993-94 Four Hills Tournament took place at the four traditional venues of Oberstdorf, Garmisch-Partenkirchen, Innsbruck and Bischofshofen, located in Germany and Austria, between 30 December 1993 and 6 January 1994.

Results

Overall

References

External links 
 Official website 

Four Hills Tournament
1993 in ski jumping
1994 in ski jumping
1993 in German sport
1994 in German sport
1994 in Austrian sport
December 1993 sports events in Europe
January 1994 sports events in Europe
1993 in Bavaria
1994 in Bavaria
1990s in Innsbruck